"Jezebel" is a song recorded by American country music artist Chely Wright.  It was released in December 2001 as the second single from the album Never Love You Enough.  The song reached number 23 on the Billboard Hot Country Singles & Tracks chart. Jay DeMarcus, of Rascal Flatts and formerly of Wright's road band, co-wrote the song with Marcus Hummon.

Content
The song is an up-tempo "fusion of contemporary country and traditional elements" about a woman confronting another woman with whom her man has had an affair.

Critical reception
Deborah Evans Price of Billboard reviewed the song favorably, comparing the song's theme to "Jolene" by Dolly Parton: "[w]hile 'Jolene' left Parton begging with the temptress to release her man, 'Jezebel' finds Wright passionately staking her claim and boldly confronting her competition." She also praised Wright's "engaging vocal personality" and the production.

Chart performance

References

2001 singles
2001 songs
Chely Wright songs
Songs written by Jay DeMarcus
Songs written by Marcus Hummon
Song recordings produced by Paul Worley
MCA Nashville Records singles